Porolissum was an ancient Roman city in Dacia. Established as a military camp in 106 during Trajan's Dacian Wars, the city quickly grew through trade with the native Dacians and became the capital of the province Dacia Porolissensis in 124. The site is one of the largest and best-preserved archaeological sites in modern-day Romania. It is 8 km away from the modern city of Zalău, in Moigrad-Porolissum village, Mirsid Commune, Sălaj County.

History
In 106, at the beginning of his second war against the Dacians, Emperor Trajan established a military stronghold at the site to defend the main passageway through the Carpathian mountains. The fort, initially built of wood on stone foundations, was garrisoned with 5000 auxiliary troops transferred from Spain, Gaul and Britain. Even though the name Porolissum appears to be Dacian in origin, archaeologists have so far uncovered no evidence of a Dacian settlement preceding the Roman fort.

In the following decades, the fort was enlarged and rebuilt in stone (possibly under the reign of Marcus Aurelius), and a canaba, a civilian settlement developed around the military center. When Hadrian created the new province Dacia Porolissensis (named for the now sizable city) in 124, Porolissum became the administrative center of the province. Under emperor Septimius Severus, the city was granted municipium status, allowing its leaders and merchants to act independently. Although the Romans withdrew from Dacia ca. 271 under Aurelian, Porolissum may have been gradually abandoned in the course of the 260's.

Even though the city was founded as a military center in the middle of a war, the garrison of Porolissum seems to have lived in peaceful coexistence with their Dacian neighbours – several Dacian villages that were apparently founded after the city of Porolissum have been uncovered by archaeologists on the surrounding hills. There are also some inscriptions mentioning city officials with Romano-Dacian names, indicating close cooperation on a political level.

Excavations
Limited archaeological work at Porolissum began in the 19th century, but it was not until 1977 when Romanian archaeologists began larger-scale, systematic excavations. The excavations by a number of teams are ongoing and have uncovered remnants of both the military installations and the civilian city, including public baths, a customs house, a temple to Liber Pater, an amphitheatre, insula consisting of four buildings and a number of houses. The main gate (Porta Praetoria) of the stone fortress has been rebuilt. A joint American-Romanian team, the Porolissum Forum Project, excavated an area of the civilian settlement from 2004–2011; despite the name of the project, the team confirmed that while this area served a public function, it was not necessarily a forum.

From 2006 until 2011, another project, "Necropolis Porolissensis", was running focused on the cemetery of the municipium Porolissum, on the spot known as "Ursoies". From 2008 to 2011 a Romanian-German-Hungarian team was excavating an underground-building in the centre of the castle, probably a water cistern.

In 2015, archaeologists from Zalău County Museum unearthed a stone sarcophagus containing skeletal remains of a young person. The sarcophagus is unusual because it was not found in the cemetery, rather it was discovered by chance during restoration of another part of the ruins. The limestone lid has carvings that were common in Roman times, and it has a hole that suggests that the grave was robbed in antiquity.

Temple of Jupiter

Temple of Liber Pater

Temple of Nemesis

Nemesis was the goddess of justice, fortune and destiny. It was believed that she influenced the fate of those who were frequently faced with death and danger, so she was worshipped especially by soldiers and gladiators. Thus, the goddess was closely linked to the world of amphitheaters. Places of worship dedicated to her are near amphitheaters or even embedded in the building. The sanctuary of Porolissum was built in the late 2nd century or in the beginning of the 3rd century AD. Probably it was also a place of worship of other deities which were linked in one way or another to amphitheatre activities, especially animal fighting (venatio), such as Liber Pater: god of vegetation and vines, or Silvanus: protector god of forests, pastures and wild animals.

Amphitheater

The amphitheater was built as a wood structure during the reign of Hadrian. Later, in 157 AD, it has been rebuilt in stone.

Gallery

In popular culture
Porolissum is the primary setting of Harry Turtledove's science fiction novel Gunpowder Empire.

See also 
 Potaissa (castra)
 Napoca (castra)
 Apulum (castra)
 List of castra in Dacia
 Roman Dacia
 History of Romania

Notes

References

 Princeton Encyclopedia of Classical Sites – Entry for Porolissum, retrieved March 29, 2006
  – an Overview of the Porolissum Forum Project archaeological excavations, retrieved April 4, 2017
 STRATEG. Strategii defensive şi politici transfrontaliere. Integrarea spaţiului Dunării de Jos în civilizaţia romană
 Romanian-German-Hungarian excavation inside the castle

Further reading 

 Complexul arheologic Porolissum
 Princeton Encyclopedia of Classical Sites – Entry for Porolissum, retrieved March 29, 2006
 Porolissum.org – an Overview of the archaeological excavations, retrieved March 29, 2006
 STRATEG. Strategii defensive şi politici transfrontaliere. Integrarea spaţiului Dunării de Jos în civilizaţia romană
 Romanian-German-Hungarian excavation inside the castle

External links 

 Complexul arheologic Porolissum
 Prolissum Video
 Roman castra from Romania – Google Maps / Earth

Roman sites in Romania
Former populated places in Eastern Europe
Roman towns and cities in Romania
Historic monuments in Sălaj County